The  2001 Four Continents Figure Skating Championships (4CC) is an annual figure skating competition. It was held at the Delta Center in Salt Lake City, USA on February 7–10. Medals were awarded in the disciplines of men's singles, ladies' singles, pair skating, and ice dancing. It was the official site-testing competition before the 2002 Winter Olympics, which would be held in that arena.

Medals table

Results

Men

Ladies

Pairs

Ice dancing

External links
 2001 Four Continents Figure Skating Championships
 Nikodinov Saves Best Jump Until After the Competition

Four Continents Figure Skating Championships, 2001
Four Continents Figure Skating Championships
Four Continents
Four Continents Figure Skating